The Kolon Korea Open, as it is currently known for sponsorship reasons, is a men's professional golf tournament that has been held annually in South Korea since 1958.

The Korea Open was an event on the Asia Golf Circuit from 1970 until 1981. The Maekyung Open was founded in 1982 to replace it on the circuit, which allowed rescheduling of the Korea Open to later in the year. It became a stop on the Asian Tour from 1998 to 2008, except for 2005, and then part of the OneAsia Tour schedule from 2009 to 2017, before returning to the Asian Tour in 2018.

In 2019, the total purse is KRW1,200,000,000 with KRW300,000,000 to the winner. The event has been played at Woo Jeong Hills since 2003.

In 2017, the winner and runner-up were eligible to compete in the 2017 Open Championship. Neither the winner, Chang Yi-keun, nor runner-up, Kim Gi-whan, had already qualified for the Open Championship so both took their places at the event. It was the first time either had played in the event. In 2018 the tournament became part of the Open Qualifying Series with two places available for the leading players not already qualified for the Open Championship.

Winners

Notes

References

External links
 
Coverage on the Asian Tour's official site
Past champions 

Korean Tour events
Asia Golf Circuit events
Asian Tour events
Golf tournaments in South Korea
Recurring sporting events established in 1958
1958 establishments in South Korea
Spring (season) events in South Korea